Byttneria obtusata is a species of flowering plant in the family Malvaceae. It is found only in Ecuador. Its natural habitat is subtropical or tropical moist montane forests.

References

obtusata
Endemic flora of Ecuador
Endangered plants
Taxonomy articles created by Polbot